Rinne, also Königseer Rinne, is a river of Thuringia, Germany. It flows into the Schwarza in Bad Blankenburg.

See also
List of rivers of Thuringia

Rivers of Thuringia
Rivers of Germany